Conrad Buff may refer to:

 Conrad Buff II (1886–1975), artist and children's book illustrator
 Conrad Buff III (1926–1989), architect, principal of Buff, Smith and Hensman
 Conrad Buff IV (1948—), film editor